Carrigagulla (Irish: Carraig an Ghiolla) is a megalithic complex 2.9 km north-east of Ballinagree, County Cork, Ireland. 

It consists of two axial stone circle, two stone rows, and an ogham stone which has been moved around a half mile away.

Features
Carrigagulla A is a 7.8m diameter stone circle comprising 15 standing stones circling a central slab. It is thought that there originally may have been  17 stones in place. The Carrigagulla NE stone row comprising five stones, four of which have been moved and are now used as gates. The stone row at Carrigagulla SW is built from three stones, one of which has fallen.

Carrigagulla Ogham Stone was discovered by Coillte Teoranta during peat cutting, but the exact location of the find is not known. It has been housed in Cork Public Museum since 1940.

See also
 List of megalithic monuments in Cork

References

Sources
  Denis Power (1997). Archaeological inventory of County Cork, Volume 3: Mid Cork, 6435 P10.   ColorBooks.

External links
Irish Megaliths - Selected Monuments in County Cork
Megalithomania

Megalithic monuments in Ireland
Archaeological sites in County Cork
Stone circles in Ireland
National Monuments in County Cork